The Illegal Contracts Act [1970] is a New Zealand law that manages how contracts are deemed illegal under either common law or under Statute.

Under this law, all such contracts are deemed illegal, but it gives wide discretionary powers to grant relief, including granting orders such as ordering:
 validation (declaring the contract to be either partially or fully enforceable)
  variation of the contract
  restitution
  compensation (damages)

External links
Illegal Contracts Act [1970] text of the Act

Statutes of New Zealand
1970 in New Zealand law
New Zealand contract law